Elections were held in Lanark County, Ontario on October 25, 2010 in conjunction with municipal elections across the province.

Lanark County Council

Beckwith

Carleton Place

Drummond/North Elmsley

Lanark Highlands

Mississippi Mills

Montague

Perth

Tay Valley

References

2010 Ontario municipal elections
Lanark County